Dan Briggs may refer to:
Dan Briggs (musician) (born 1985), bassist for Between the Buried and Me
Dan Briggs (baseball) (born 1952), Major League Baseball first baseman
Dan Briggs, a fictional character in the TV series Mission: Impossible